Marsha E. Barnes was a United States State Department official and United States Ambassador to Suriname from November 2003.

Barnes received a bachelor's degree from Lake Forest College in 1969 and a master's degree from National War College.

References

External links

"Marsha E. Barnes" on U.S. Department of State website.

Ambassadors of the United States to Suriname
Living people
Lake Forest College alumni
National War College alumni
Year of birth missing (living people)
American women ambassadors
Ambassadors of the United States
21st-century American women